"The Greatest Hero of Them All" is a story arc that was published by DC Comics, and presented in Superman vol. 2, #8, Action Comics #591, and Legion of Super-Heroes vol. 3, #37–38 from August through September 1987. It was written by Paul Levitz and John Byrne, and pencilled by Byrne, Greg LaRocque and Mike DeCarlo. The story arc was DC’s first attempt to correct the inconsistencies in Legion history created when the original Superboy was removed from mainstream DC continuity in the Man of Steel limited series.

In the aftermath of the Zero Hour and Infinite Crisis miniseries, this story is no longer canonical.

Plot
In the 30th century, Legion of Super-Heroes co-founder Cosmic Boy and his girlfriend Night Girl (of the Legion of Substitute Heroes) have returned from a journey to 20th century Earth, where they were attacked by the Time Trapper and found history altered such that Superman never had a teenage career as Superboy. Brainiac 5, Ultra Boy, Sun Boy, Cosmic Boy, Night Girl, Blok, Invisible Kid (Jacques Foccart) and Mon-El take a Time Bubble in an effort to breach the Trapper’s "Iron Curtain" and reach his Citadel at the End of Time. However, the Trapper redirects them to 20th century Smallville, Kansas, the home of Superboy. Several of the Legionnaires try to blend into town wearing 20th century clothing when they are recognized by Pete Ross, Superboy’s best friend and an honorary Legionnaire. After Pete makes a passing reference to Superboy saving Smallville from "red skies" and an energy wall, the Legionnaires arrive at the Kent General Store, where Mon-El and Ultra Boy are reunited with Jonathan and Martha Kent. Later that evening, Superboy (as Clark Kent) arrives at the Kent farm. He surprises the Legionnaires by using the Phantom Zone Projector to freeze them in time-stasis. Realizing that something is amiss, Pete locates and warns the remaining Legionnaires, who enter the Time Bubble and escape into the time stream, just as Superboy arrives to attack them.

Just over a decade later, Brainiac 5, Sun Boy, Blok and Invisible Kid arrive in Smallville, almost immediately attracting the attention of Superman. The Legionnaires attack him, occasionally calling him Superboy. However, Superman does not recognize them, and knows of no one named Superboy except Superboy-Prime, who has not been seen since the Crisis. When Superman has no recollection of meeting and being inducted into the Legion, it becomes apparent that he is a separate individual from the Boy of Steel. Suddenly, Superboy arrives, places the Legionnaires in time-stasis and returns to his own time. Superman follows, barely able to keep up with the faster Superboy. From his Citadel, the Time Trapper observes the transpiring events. He also recalls how he created a "pocket universe", with its own Earth, its own Krypton and its own Kal-El. In this pocket universe, Kal-El became Superboy at the age of eight, and it is to this universe that the Trapper has directed the Legion whenever they have travelled through time.

In the pocket universe, Superman encounters Pete Ross and the Kents (who initially assume that he is their Superboy, aged due to exposure to red kryptonite), but is soon attacked by Superboy. After the two engage in combat for a time, with Superboy's greater power being countered by Superman's superior experience, Jonathan Kent attempts to stop Superman using multiple varieties of kryptonite, but they are ineffective because Superman hails from a parallel universe. However, Superman soon deduces that Superboy has been continually holding back, giving Superman opportunities to win their battle, forcing him to admit that he knows he is in the wrong. Superboy and the Legion depart to rescue the other Legionnaires and face the Time Trapper. They leave Superman behind, fearful of the consequences to history if he is killed or otherwise unable to return.

Superboy explains to the Legionnaires that the Time Trapper protected Earth in his era from destruction during the Crisis, and promised to keep it safe in return for Superboy's cooperation in defeating the Legion. When they find the Trapper, they engage him in battle, inadvertently smashing the machine that protected the pocket universe Earth from the effects of the Crisis. With the red skies and antimatter returning (and with Brainiac 5 unable to repair the machinery), Superboy replaces the damaged unit with his own body. The gambit works and the Earth is saved, but the Boy of Steel is gravely weakened. With the Trapper having now made time travel perilously unsafe, Superboy flies the Legionnaires back to the 30th century, carrying the Time Bubble himself. Shortly after their arrival, Superboy dies in Mon-El's arms. The entire Legion mourns his passing, remembering him as "the greatest hero of them all".

Aftermath

Superman
Following Superboy's disappearance from the pocket universe Earth, the Lex Luthor of that world is tricked into releasing Kryptonian criminals General Zod, Quex-Ul and Zaora from the Phantom Zone. They proceed to lay waste to the planet, eventually killing its entire population. Having been summoned from the regular universe by Luthor and Supergirl, Superman executes the genocidal killers using green kryptonite, and brings Supergirl (a protoplasmic duplicate of Lana Lang) with him back to his own Earth.

Legion of Super-Heroes
While the entire Legion mourns Superboy's death, four members are particularly outraged: Saturn Girl (one of the three founders who invited Superboy to join), Brainiac 5 (who now realizes that all of his theories about time travel are incorrect), Mon-El (who regards Superboy as a brother), and Duo Damsel (who considers Superboy to be her first love, having once had an unrequited crush on him). The four secretly enter into a conspiracy to attack and destroy the Time Trapper at the End of Time. With the assistance of honorary Legionnaire Rond Vidar (who reveals himself to be the Green Lantern of Sector 2814), they barely succeed. However, another one of Duo Damsel's three bodies is killed, leaving her with only one.

Continuity

The Man of Steel
When DC Comics decided to revamp the Superman mythos following the Crisis on Infinite Earths limited series, it released John Byrne's 1986 limited series The Man of Steel. Under the new chronology, Clark Kent did not begin his career as a costumed superhero until adulthood. This created major inconsistencies in Legion history, for not only did Superboy join the team as a teenager, but he serves as the primary inspiration for the founding of the Legion itself. In order to resolve this discrepancy and preserve as much of Legion history as possible, the "Greatest Hero of Them All" story arc was crafted, establishing that Superboy was a different being from a different universe, and that the Legion had not previously journeyed to the mainstream universe seen in post-Crisis continuity.

Removal from the Superman family
Eventually, the DC editors determined that the connection between Superman and the Legion should be completely severed. Legion writers Keith Giffen, Tom and Mary Bierbaum and Al Gordon revised the team's history, such that the Time Trapper was replaced in continuity by his former underling Glorith. In this new timeline, Lar Gand became an intergalactic legend in the 20th century, adopting the codename Valor instead of Mon-El. Glorith would later banish Valor to a 1000-year imprisonment in the Phantom Zone (renamed the Bgztl Buffer Zone). As a consequence of these changes, the "Greatest Hero of Them All" story arc was rendered non-canonical.

In 1994, DC released the Zero Hour: Crisis in Time limited series, as a means of resolving several paradoxes in the DC timeline. Subsequently, Legion continuity was completely rebooted, and the Post-Zero Hour team that was introduced thereafter had no connection to Superman or Superboy, with Valor once again serving as the team's inspiration. Another reboot in 2004 would introduce a third version of the Legion, one inspired by the costumed heroes of the 21st century, but not Superman in particular.

Post-Infinite Crisis
An additional major revamp to DC continuity occurs via the 2005–2006 limited series Infinite Crisis. Among the resulting changes is the restoration of much the Legion's pre-Crisis history. Once again, Superman is the legendary hero who serves as the inspiration for the Legion. As in the original Legion story, the three founding members journeyed to the past to invite the teenage Clark Kent to join the team. However, he only uses the name Superboy in the 31st century as a Legion member, and his 21st century career as a superhero does not begin until he reaches adulthood.

Collected editions
This story is included as part of the trade paperback collection Superman: The Man of Steel, Vol. 4.

References

Legion of Super-Heroes storylines
Superman storylines
1987 in comics
Comics about time travel
Comics by John Byrne (comics)
Comics by Paul Levitz